Pol Maj Gen Surachate Hakparn (born on 29 October 1970), nicknamed Big Joke, is a Thai police officer and current deputy national police chief of Thailand. He had held several posts, including commissioner of the MPB, or Tourist Police Bureau.

Early life
Surachate Hakparn was born in 1970 in Songkhla. His father was a junior police officer who had close ties to Samer Damapong, a former deputy police chief.

Career
He enrolled in Class 31 of the Armed Forces Academies Preparatory School. Afterwards, he joined Class 41 of the Royal Police Cadet Academy (RPCA). A rising star among RPCA Class 41 alumni, Surachate rose quickly through the ranks. After being appointed deputy inspector at age 24 in Chiang Mai province, he rose to inspector in 2000 at age 30, deputy superintendent in 2004, and superintendent in 2008.

In 2012, he was appointed the deputy commander of Songkhla Police Force. During this time, he also led a forward command overseeing four insurgency-hit border districts, which added to his service record.  In 2015, he was promoted to the rank of police major general.

Since leading a crackdown on foreigners illegally staying in Thailand in 2017, Surachate has become one of the most visible faces of the Royal Thai Police. His handling of the case of a Saudi woman who narrowly avoided deportation from Thailand on her way to Australia earned him praise.

In a short period of time, he rose through the ranks and became an acting commander of the office of the Commissioner General, where he was responsible for policy coordination with the prime minister. After that, he was appointed deputy commander of the Patrol and Special Operations Division, and then he was promoted to the position of chief of the Office of the Commissioner-General.

After that, he was appointed the deputy commander of the Patrol and Special Operations Division, and then he was promoted to the position of chief of the Office of the Commissioner-General. He was then appointed commander of the Tourist Police Division and the Patrol and Special Operations Division.  In August 2018, he was named assistant spokesman for Deputy Prime Minister Prawit Wongsuwan. He was appointed as the chief of the Immigration Bureau in September 2018 and removed from his post in 2019 for unclear reasons. As chief of the Immigration Bureau, he frequently appeared in news headlines.

On 17 March 2019, he was  appointed the Royal Thai Police's special adviser on strategy (Level 9) by Prime Minister Prayut Chan-o-cha. The position was newly created in February and is equal in rank to an assistant police chief position.

References

1970 births
Living people
Surachate Hakparn